The Association of Pacific Coast Geographers (APCG) promotes scholarly research in geography and disseminates geographic information in the Pacific Coast region of North America.

History
The organization was founded in 1935 at the University of California, Los Angeles and incorporated in 1962 at the University of Washington in Seattle. Since 1952, the APCG has also served as the Pacific Coast Regional Division of the Association of American Geographers, serving Alaska, Arizona, British Columbia, California, Hawaii, Idaho, Nevada, Oregon, Washington, and Yukon Territory. It is currently headquartered at California State University, Sacramento.

Publications
The APCG produces a semiannual newsletter, Pacifica, and an annual journal, the Yearbook of the Association of Pacific Coast Geographers, published by the University of Hawaii Press.

External links
Association of Pacific Coast Geographers

1935 establishments in California
Geographic societies
Learned societies of the United States